Paper Lives is a 1966 comedy novel by the British writer Compton Mackenzie. A satire on the Civil Service, it is a sequel to his 1941 novel The Red Tapeworm.

References

Bibliography
 David Joseph Dooley. Compton Mackenzie. Twayne Publishers, 1974.

1966 British novels
Novels by Compton Mackenzie
Chatto & Windus books